Veljko (Cyrillic script: Вељко) is a masculine given name of Slavic origin. It may refer to:

FK Hajduk Veljko, Serbian football club based in Negotin, Serbia
Hajduk Veljko Petrović (1780–1813), Vojvoda of the First Serbian Uprising rebellion against the Ottoman Empire
Veljko Čubrilović (1886–1915), involved in the assassination of Archduke Franz Ferdinand of Austria
Veljko Popić (born 2005), Serbian war hero 
Veljko Bakašun (1920–2007), Croat water polo player
Veljko Bulajić (born 1928), Yugoslavian film director and actor from Montenegro
Veljko Despot, born March 4, 1948, in Belgrade
Veljko Kadijević (born 1925), former General of the Army in the Yugoslav People's Army
Veljko Milatović (1921–2004), Montenegrin Communist partisan, politician, statesman
Veljko Nikitović (born 1980), Serbian footballer who currently plays for Górnik Łęczna
Veljko Paunović (born 1977), former Serbian footballer
Veljko Petković (born 1977), Serbian volleyball player
Veljko Petrović (poet) (1884–1967), leading Post-Modernist Serbian poet
Veljko Stanojević (1892–1967), Serbian painter
Veljko Uskoković (born 1971), Montenegrin water polo player
Veljko Vlahović (1914–1975), Montenegrin member of the Yugoslav Communist Party from 1935

See also
Veljković
Veljkovo

Slavic masculine given names
Serbian masculine given names